Marist College is a college in Poughkeepsie, New York, U.S.

Marist College may also refer to:

In Australia:
Marist College Ashgrove, Queensland
Marist College Canberra, Pearce, Australian Capital Territory
Marist College Eastwood, New South Wales
Marist College Kogarah, New South Wales
Marist College Penshurst, Mortdale, New South Wales
Marist Catholic College North Shore, North Sydney, New South Wales
Marist College Rosalie, Paddington, Queensland
Marist Regional College, Burnie, Tasmania

In Ireland:
Marist College, Athlone

In New Zealand:
Marist College, Auckland

See also
List of Marist Brothers schools
Marist School (disambiguation)